Camp Lo is an American hip hop duo, formed in 1995, which hails from The Bronx, New York. The duo consists of rappers Sonny Cheeba (Salahadeen Wilds) and Geechi Suede (Saladine Wallace). The duo is perhaps best known for their 1997 hit "Luchini AKA This Is It".

Career
Initially signed with Profile Records, Camp Lo made their first appearance in 1996 on The Great White Hype soundtrack, with their single, "Coolie High". The smooth party song was a minor hit, peaking at #25 on the Billboard Hot Rap Singles chart. Their first major exposure came with the release of their second single, the upbeat, horn-driven "Luchini", otherwise known as "This Is It". The song became a crossover hit in 1997, breaking into the Top 50 on the Billboard Hot 100, and reaching the top 5 on the Hot Rap Singles chart. The track peaked at #74 in the UK Singles Chart in August 1997. The duo released their debut album Uptown Saturday Night in January 1997. The effort was widely acclaimed, praised for its accessible content and smooth, funk- and jazz-inspired production.

The majority of the album was produced by Ski, famous for his work with Jay-Z. Guest appearances were provided by De La Soul's Trugoy and Digable Planets' Butterfly. The album's 1970s styled content was influential on a number of artists within the next few years after its release, like Will Smith, who enlisted Camp Lo for an appearance on his top-selling Big Willie Style album. Also in 1997, they appeared on Oran "Juice" Jones' single "Poppin' That Fly". They collaborated with De La Soul in 2000, on the song "So Good" from the Hip Hop 101 Compilation. They finally returned with another album in 2002, titled Let's Do It Again. This effort was not nearly as well-received as their debut, and was met with mediocre reviews and sales. Shortly after the album's release, Aesop Rock enlisted the duo to appear on his album Bazooka Tooth, exposing them to fans of the underground Definitive Jux label. In 2007, the duo returned with Black Hollywood after a five-year hiatus from their previous release.

In April 2008, Camp Lo signed with SRC/Universal Records and changed its name to the Lo, on the recommendation from DJ Mr. Cee. The duo released a new single titled "Lumdi", produced by Korleon. They also confirmed a 2011 release for a new collaboration album with Pete Rock, as they form their new group '80 Blocks From Tiffanys'.

In 2012, Geechi Suede collaborated with TheeKIDICARUS on a song "Ask About Me" where TheeKIDICARUS would produce the track.

In 2013, Geechi Suede was featured on the song "21st Century" from #TheRevival, a compilation album by Philly-based rappers/producers Franz Kafka and The TradeMark Experience.

In May 2015, Camp Lo released a song titled "Black Jesus" via 2DOPEBOYZ in anticipation for their 5th album titled Ragtime Hightimes. On May 18, 2015, Camp Lo released their album Ragtime Hightimes.

In 2016, Sonny Cheeba featured on The Avalanches' song "Because I'm Me" on the album Wildflower.

On September 22, 2017, Camp Lo released the first of three A Piece of the Action albums series, leading up to their sixth album titled The Get Down Brothers.

Discography

Albums

Chart singles

References

External links
 OfficialCampLo.com Official website
 CampLo on Facebook
 Camp Lo on Myspace

African-American musical groups
American musical duos
Hip hop duos
Hip hop groups from New York City
Musical groups established in 1995
Profile Records artists
Universal Records artists
Musical groups from the Bronx